Karl-Otto Alberty (also Karl Otto Alberty, 13 November 1933 – 25 April 2015) was a German actor.

Alberty was born as Karl-Otto Poensgen in Berlin on 13 November 1933. He started out as an amateur boxer before discovering a talent for acting, making his début at the City Theatre in Konstanz in 1959. He then began to take supporting roles in films. He made his first appearance in English language films as an SD officer (who captures Richard Attenborough) in The Great Escape (1963). With his broad face, broken nose and distinctive white-blond hair, he would go on to play variations of the role of German officers in a series of films, notably Battle of the Bulge (1965), Andrew V. McLaglen's The Devil's Brigade (1968), Luchino Visconti's The Damned (1969), and as a Waffen-SS tank commander of a Tiger I tank from the 1st SS Panzer Division LSSAH  in Kelly's Heroes (1970). He played a Luftwaffe general in Battle of Britain (1969). He also continued to work in both Germany and Italy in a wide variety of films from dramas and comedies to spaghetti westerns. He also made regular appearances on German television. His last appearance was in the TV series War and Remembrance (1988). He was variously credited as Charles Albert, Charles Alberty and Carlo Alberti.

Alberty died on 25 April 2015, at the age of 81.

Selected filmography

 (1961) - Bob
 (1961)
Denn das Weib ist schwach (1961) - Kovacz
The Phony American (1961)
 (1963) - Staff Sergeant Knorr
The Great Escape (1963) - S.S. Lieutenant Steinach
Time of the Innocent (1964)
Oklahoma John (1965) - Hondo
The House in Karp Lane (1965) - Leopold Glaser
The Battle of the Bulge (1965) - Maj. Von Diepel
Is Paris Burning? (1966) - S.S. Officer - Bayeux Tapestry
Day of Anger (1967) - Blonde Deputy with Harmonica
Assignment K (1968) - Fake Policeman (uncredited)
L'Odissea (TV miniseries, 1968) - Eurimaco
The Devil's Brigade  (1968) - German Officer (uncredited)
Midas Run (1969) - Mark Dietrich
On the Reeperbahn at Half Past Midnight (1969) - Hotte Priemel
Battle of Britain (1969) - General Hans Jeschonnek, Luftwaffe Chief of Staff
Help Me, My Love (1969) - Bauer, the choreographer
The Damned (1969) - 1st Wehrmacht Officer 
The Secret of Santa Vittoria (1969) - Otto
Kelly's Heroes (1970) - German Tank Commander
 (1970) - second Commissar
The Great White Hope (1970) - Hans
The Lickerish Quartet (1970) - Bit Part (uncredited)
Raid on Rommel (1971) - Capt. Heinz Schroeder
Slaughterhouse-Five (1972) - German Guard - Group Two
Assignment: Munich (1972) - Fritz
Bluebeard (1972) - Von Sepper's Friend
The Salzburg Connection (1972) - First Stocky Man
Plot (1972)
Ein Käfer gibt Vollgas (1972) - Marchese de la Sotta
Flatfoot in Egypt (1980) - The Swede
Die Insel der blutigen Plantage (1983) - Otto Globocnik
The Winds of War (TV miniseries, 1983) - White-Haired Gestapo
War and Remembrance (TV miniseries, 1988) - Scharführer Rudolf Haindl (final appearance)

References

External links

1933 births
2015 deaths
20th-century German male actors
German expatriate male actors in the United States
German male film actors
Male actors from Berlin